The State Administration for Market Regulation (SAMR), is the ministerial-level agency directly under the State Council of the People's Republic of China in charge of regulating areas such as market competition, monopolies, intellectual property, and drug safety. It is mainly responsible for the comprehensive market supervision and management, unifying the registration of market entities and establishing information disclosure and sharing mechanisms; organizing the comprehensive law enforcement of market supervision, undertaking unified anti-monopoly law enforcement, regulating and maintaining market order; organizing the implementation of the strategy of strengthening the country by quality, and is responsible Industrial product quality and safety, food safety, special equipment safety supervision; unified management of measurement standards, inspection and testing, certification and accreditation. The Administration was created in the 2018 Chinese overhaul of government administration, and merged or abolished a number of previous agencies, such as the State Intellectual Property Office. SAMR was created under the banner of the Central Comprehensively Deepening Reforms Commission under Xi Jinping, current General Secretary of the Chinese Communist Party.

History 
The Administration consolidates in one ministry the market regulation functions previously shared by three separate agencies, the General Administration of Quality Supervision, Inspection and Quarantine (AQSIQ), the China Food and Drug Administration (CFDA), and the State Administration of Industry and Commerce (SAIC).

On March 17, 2018, the first meeting of the 13th National People's Congress passed the "Decision of the First Meeting of the Thirteenth National People's Congress on the State Council Institutional Reform Program" and approved the "State Council Institutional Reform Program." The plan stipulates: "The establishment of the State Administration for Market Supervision. The responsibilities of the State Administration for Industry and Commerce, the responsibilities for the State Administration of Quality Supervision, Inspection and Quarantine, the responsibilities of the State Food and Drug Administration, and the price supervision, inspection and anti-monopoly of the National Development and Reform Commission Responsibilities for law enforcement, the integration of the responsibilities of the Ministry of Commerce’s centralized anti-monopoly law enforcement and the Office of the Anti-Monopoly Commission of the State Council, and the establishment of the State Administration for Market Regulation as an agency directly under the State Council. At the same time, the establishment of the State Drug Administration, which is managed by the State Administration for Market Regulation . The responsibilities and teams of entry-exit inspection and quarantine management of the General Administration of Quality Supervision, Inspection and Quarantine shall be assigned to the General Administration of Customs. The Food Safety Commission of the State Council and the Anti-Monopoly Committee of the State Council are retained, and the specific work is undertaken by the State Administration for Market Regulation. The National Certification and Accreditation Administration Commission The responsibilities of the National Standardization Administration Committee are transferred to the State Administration for Market Supervision and Administration, and the brand is retained externally. The State Administration for Industry and Commerce, the State Administration of Quality Supervision, Inspection and Quarantine, and the State Food and Drug Administration are no longer retained."

On March 21, 2018, the State Administration for Market Regulation was formally established. On April 10, 2018, the State Administration for Market Regulation was officially listed, and the "State Administration for Market Regulation" sign with black lettering on a white background was hung at the entrance of the original State Administration for Industry and Commerce  .

On October 17, 2020, the Thirteenth Standing Committee of the National 22nd meeting on revising the " People's Republic of China on the National Flag ," " People's Republic of China on the National Emblem ," the decision states that "the people's governments at all levels of the market supervision The department supervises and manages the production and sales of the national flag ." "The market supervision and management departments of the people's governments at all levels supervise and manage the production and sales of the national emblem  ."

On December 22, 2020, the State Council of the People's Republic of China adopted the “ Decision of the State Council on Implementing the Unified Registration of Movable Property and Rights Guarantee ” (Guo Fa [2020] No. 18), which stipulates that it will be implemented nationwide from January 1, 2021, Unified registration of movable property and rights guarantee. At the same time, it is stipulated that the State Administration for Market Regulation no longer assumes the responsibility of "managing the registration of chattel mortgages". The People's Bank of China is responsible for formulating a unified registration system for production equipment, raw materials, semi-finished products, product mortgages and accounts receivable pledges, and promotes the facilitation of registration services.

Leadership

References 

Government agencies of China
2018 establishments in China
Competition regulators